The Battle of Texel was part of the Franco-Dutch War fought in 1673. 

Battle of Texel may also refer to:
Battle of Scheveningen, fought near Texel in 1653
 Battle of Texel (1673) or Battle of Kijkduin
Battle of Texel (1694), part of the Nine Years' War
Battle off Texel (1914), part of the First World War
Georgian uprising on Texel, part of the Second World War
Capture of the Dutch fleet at Den Helder in 1795, part of the War of the First Coalition